Dominik Prpić (born 19 May 2004) is a Croatian professional footballer who plays as a defender for Hajduk Split.

Club career
Prpić started practicing football at the age of six at NK Zagreb, until early 2017, when he moved to NK Lokomotiva, but, having been scouted by HNK Hajduk Split, he moved to the Dalmatian club that same summer. At Hajduk, he featured regularly for his generation in the following years, and, on 2 June 2022, had his contract with the club extended until the summer of 2025. He was subsequently added to the senior team. He made his league debut coming in for Stefan Simić in the 2-2 away draw with NK Slaven Belupo on November 12th 2022. His first game in the starting lineup was the 2-1 win against HNK Šibenik on January 22nd 2023.

Personal life 
Prpić is from Zagreb, with roots from the Lika region and Dubrovnik.

References

External links

2004 births
Living people
Footballers from Zagreb
Croatian footballers
Croatia youth international footballers
HNK Hajduk Split players
First Football League (Croatia) players
Croatian Football League players